Wilma Smith may refer to: 

 Wilma Smith (violinist) (born 1956), Fijian-born violinist
 Wilma Smith (newscaster) (born 1946), American television news anchor